Scanner is a German power metal band that was formed in 1986. Three of the band members had previously taken part in an album release by the band Lions Breed, Damn the Night (Earthshaker 1985). The band changed its name to Scanner, adopting a science fiction image for their lyrics, album covers and live performances. They released their first album, Hypertrace, in 1988 through Noise Records. They have reformed twice, releasing their latest album on 23 January 2015, The Judgement (Massacre Records).

Members

Current line-up 
Axel A.J. Julius – guitars (1986–1990, 1995–present)
Efthimios Ioannidis – vocals (2003–present)
Stefan Weber – guitars (2019–present)
Jörn Bettentrup – bass (2019–present)
Boris Frenkel – drums (2019–present)

Past members 
Thilo Zaun – guitars (1997–2006)
Martin Bork – bass (1986–1990)
Wolfgang Kolorz – drums (1986–1990)
Thomas Sopha – guitars (1986–1990)
Michael "M.A.J.O.R." Knoblich – vocals (1986–1989)
S.L. Coe – vocals (1989–1990)
Haridon Lee – vocals (1995–1997)
John A.B.C. Smith – bass (1995–1997)
D.D. Bucco – drums (1995–1997)
Stefan Nicolai – guitars (1995–1997)
Stephan Braun – keyboards (1996–1997)
Marc Simon – bass (1997–2003)
Johannes Brunn – keyboards (2000–2005)
Jan Zimmer – drums (2002–2003)
Lisa Croft – vocals (2002–2003)
Stephan Jacobs – bass (2003–2004)
Franz Eichberger – drums (2003–2005, 2011–2013)
Kayuri Niwa – bass (2004–2006)
Florian Haack – guitars (2006–2007)
Torben Böhm – bass (2007–2008)
Oliver Emanowski – bass (2009–2012)
Matt Bauer – drums (2009–2010)
Patrick Klose – drums (2010–2011, 2013–2015)
Andreas Zeidler – guitars (2007–2019)
Hanno Kirstan – drums (2015–2019)
Jonathan Sell – bass (2012–2019)

Timeline

Discography

Albums 
Hypertrace (Sony / Noise 1988)
Terminal Earth (Sony / Noise 1989)
Mental Reservation (1995)
Ball of the Damned (1997)
Scantropolis (2002)
The Judgement (Massacre Records 2015), CD and video

Demos 
Conception of a Cure (1994)

References

External links 
Official website
Massacre Records

German heavy metal musical groups
Musical groups established in 1986
1986 establishments in West Germany
Massacre Records artists
Noise Records artists